Eivind Rasmussen (1 February 1894 – 3 August 1977) was a Norwegian middle-distance runner. He competed in the men's 1500 metres at the 1920 Summer Olympics.

References

1894 births
1977 deaths
Athletes (track and field) at the 1920 Summer Olympics
Norwegian male middle-distance runners
Olympic athletes of Norway
Place of birth missing